Elizabeth Freya Garbus (born April 11, 1970) is an American documentary film director and producer. Notable documentaries Garbus has made are The Farm: Angola, USA, Ghosts of Abu Ghraib, Bobby Fischer Against the World, Love, Marilyn, What Happened, Miss Simone?, and Becoming Cousteau. She is co-founder and co-director of the New York City-based documentary film production company Story Syndicate.

Early life and education
Garbus grew up in New York City. She is the daughter of civil rights attorney Martin Garbus and writer, therapist, and social worker Ruth Meitin Garbus. Her family is Jewish.

In 1992, Garbus graduated magna cum laude with a bachelor's degree in history and semiotics from Brown University.

Career 
While in high school, Garbus made a documentary about students' last day of school. Then while at Brown she took classes in video production.

After college, Garbus worked as an intern at Miramax, eventually getting a job working for filmmaker Jonathan Stack.

In 1998, The Farm: Angola, USA, which she co-directed with Jonathan Stack, was nominated for an Academy Award. The film garnered multiple awards including the Sundance Grand Jury Prize and two Emmy awards.

In 1998, she co-founded an independent documentary production company, Moxie Firecracker Films, with fellow Brown University alumna Rory Kennedy. The company name is a combination of each woman's previously separate production companies: Kennedy's company was called Moxie and Garbus’ company was called Firecracker.

In 2002, Garbus' film The Execution of Wanda Jean was shown at the Sundance Film Festival.

In 2003, Garbus directed The Nazi Officer's Wife, which was narrated by Susan Sarandon and Julia Ormond.

In 2005, Garbus collaborated with partner Rory Kennedy to executive-produce Street Fight about the 2002 Newark mayoral election; it was nominated for an Academy Award.

In 2006, the pair worked with actress Rosie Perez to produce her film Yo Soy Boricua.

In 2007, Garbus' film Ghosts of Abu Ghraib premiered at Sundance and won an Emmy for Outstanding Non-Fiction Special of 2007.

In 2007, Garbus directed the film Coma, which aired on HBO in July of that year. The film follows four brain-injured patients receiving treatment at the JFK-Johnson Medical Facility in New Jersey.

In 2009, Garbus’s film, Shouting Fire: Stories from the Edge of Free Speech (HBO) premiered at the Sundance Film Festival.

In 2011, There's Something Wrong with Aunt Diane was chosen to be a part of HBO’s Documentary Films Summer Series.

In 2011, Garbus directed Bobby Fischer Against the World, which chronicled the great Cold War showdown between Bobby Fischer and Boris Spassky in 1972. The film premiered on HBO and opened the Premiere Documentary Section of the Sundance Film Festival.

Bobby Fischer Against the World, opened the documentary section of the 2011 Sundance Film Festival, reserved for master American documentary filmmakers.

In 2011, Garbus was nominated a second time for an Academy Award, for her film Killing in the Name, which she produced with her producing partner Rory Kennedy.

Garbus' 2012 film, Love, Marilyn featured Elizabeth Banks, Ellen Burstyn, Glenn Close, Viola Davis, Jennifer Ehle, Lindsay Lohan, Lili Taylor, Uma Thurman, Marisa Tomei, Evan Rachel Wood and others reading from Monroe’s never-before-seen private writings. The film opened as a Gala Premiere at the 2012 Toronto International Film Festival and was acquired by HBO for a 2013 debut.

Love, Marilyn, internationally opened as a Gala Premiere at the 2012 Toronto International Film Festival and aired on HBO summer of 2013.

In 2014, A Good Job: Stories of the FDNY, which Garbus directed and produced, premiered on HBO and featured first-hand accounts of veteran firefighters and interviews conducted by former FDNY member Steve Buscemi.

In 2015, she directed What Happened, Miss Simone? a documentary about the singer Nina Simone. What Happened, Miss Simone? was the opening night film for Sundance Film Festival, it was nominated for an Academy Award for Best Documentary Feature 2015, a Grammy for Best Music Film 2015, and Garbus was nominated for a DGA Award for Outstanding Directorial Achievement in Documentary. The film was released by Netflix on June 26, 2015. It won an Emmy Award for Outstanding Documentary.

In January 2018, The New York Times announced that Garbus and a documentary crew had been "basically living in the...newsroom since Inauguration Day [with] full access to the Russia investigation and much more." The completed work called The Fourth Estate aired on Showtime in May 2018.

In May 2018, HBO premiered Garbus' documentary, A Dangerous Son, which portrays three families as they deal with severe mental illness of three different children, and their efforts to get treatment and navigate the health care system. 

In September 2020, Garbus released All In: The Fight for Democracy, a documentary film about voting rights in the United States starring voting rights activist Stacey Abrams and featuring other American politicians including former United States Attorney General Eric Holder and then-Representative Marcia Fudge.

In 2021 Garbus released "Becoming Cousteau" with National Geographic Films.

Personal life 
Garbus is married to film producer Dan Cogan. They have a daughter, Amelia, and a son, Theodore.

Filmography

Works and publications

Selected honors and awards 
 Open Society's Center on Crime, Communities, and Culture, Fellow
 1998: Sundance Film Festival, Documentary, Grand Jury Prize for The Farm: Angola, USA with Jonathan Stack – tied with Frat House
 1998: L.A. Film Critics Association Awards, Best Documentary/Non-Fiction Film for The Farm: Angola, USA with Jonathan Stack
 1998: New York Film Critics Circle Awards, Best Non-Fiction Film for The Farm: Angola, USA with Jonathan Stack
 1999: Emmy Award, Outstanding Non-Fiction Special (nominee) for The Farm: Angola, USA with Jonathan Stack, Gayle Gilman, Michael Cascio
 1999: Academy Award, Best Documentary, Feature (nominee) for The Farm: Angola, USA with Jonathan Stack
 2002: Sundance Film Festival, Documentary, Grand Jury Prize (nominee) for The Execution of Wanda Jean
 2003: SXSW Film Festival, Documentary Feature, Audience Award for Girlhood
 2006: Emmy Award, Outstanding Continuing Coverage of a News Story - Long Form (nominee) for P.O.V. Street Fight with Rory Kennedy, Cara Mertes, Sally Jo Fifer, Marshall Curry 
 2007: Emmy Award, Outstanding Non-Fiction Special for Ghosts of Abu Ghraib with Rory Kennedy, Jack Youngelson, Diana Barrett, Sheila Nevins, Nancy Abraham
 2009: Sundance Film Festival, Documentary, Grand Jury Prize (nominee) for Shouting Fire: Stories from the Edge of Free Speech
 2012: Emmy Award, Outstanding Non-Fiction Special (nominee) for Bobby Fischer Against the World with Sheila Nevins, Dan Cogan, Stanley F. Buchthal, Rory Kennedy, Matthew Justus, Nancy Abraham
 2015: Peabody Award for What Happened, Miss Simone?
 2016: Directors Guild of America Award, Outstanding Directorial Achievement in Documentary (nominee) for What Happened, Miss Simone?
 2016: Emmy Award, Outstanding Non-Fiction Special for What Happened, Miss Simone? with Sidney Beaumont, Amy Hobby, Justin Wilkes, Jayson Jackson 
 2016: Emmy Award, Outstanding Directing for Nonfiction Programming (nominee) for What Happened, Miss Simone?
 2016: Academy Award, Best Documentary, Feature (nominee) for What Happened, Miss Simone? with Amy Hobby, Justin Wilkes
 2021: Peabody Award (nominee) for Nuclear Family

References

External links 

 
 
 
 

1970 births
Living people
Brown University alumni
American documentary film directors
Place of birth missing (living people)
20th-century American Jews
American documentary film producers
American film producers
American women documentary filmmakers
American women television directors
American television directors
21st-century American Jews
20th-century American women
21st-century American women